Benjamin Lense (born 30 November 1978) is a German former professional footballer who played as a defender. Lense made 64 appearances in the Bundesliga during his playing career.

References 

1978 births
Living people
People from Lich, Germany
Sportspeople from Giessen (region)
German footballers
Germany B international footballers
Association football defenders
Bundesliga players
2. Bundesliga players
Eintracht Frankfurt II players
Dynamo Dresden players
SV Darmstadt 98 players
Arminia Bielefeld players
1. FC Nürnberg players
VfL Bochum players
FC Hansa Rostock players
TuS Koblenz players
Footballers from Hesse